NGC 6025 (also known as Caldwell 95) is an open cluster located  2,700 light years away in the Triangulum Australe constellation. It was discovered by Abbe Lacaille in 1751 or 1752 during his South Africa tour.

External links
 
NGC 6025 at SEDS
NGC 6025 at Messier45
 

NGC 6025
6025
095b
?
Triangulum Australe